Michael Staksrud (2 June 1908 – 10 November 1940) was a Norwegian World Champion in speed skating.

Life and sports career
Born in Gran, in the district of Hadeland, Staksrud started his speed skating career at Hamar Idrettslag (Hamar Sports Club). From 1937 onward, he represented Oslo Skøiteklub (Oslo Skating Club). Together with Ivar Ballangrud and Hans Engnestangen, he formed the famous Hadeland Trio, three Norwegians who dominated both Norwegian and international speed skating in the 1930s. Seven of the nine World Allround Championships between 1930 and 1938, and six of the nine European Allround Championships between 1929 and 1937 were won by a member of this Hadeland Trio, with Staksrud himself winning three World titles and two European titles.

Another illustration of the domination of the Hadeland Trio was the 1,500 m event at a tournament in Davos on 29 January 1939. Staksrud entered that tournament as the world record holder on that distance with a time of 2:14.9. He was paired with Ballangrud and skated 2:14.4, faster than his world record time, but Ballangrud had finished 0.4 seconds earlier in a time of 2:14.0. However, neither of them became the new world record holder, because Engnestangen skated 2:13.8 in his race.

Although Staksrud participated in several events at the Winter Olympic Games of 1928, 1932, and 1936, he never won any Olympic medals. In 1940, Staksrud drowned at the age of 32. Some of his family members were helping the Germans, and it was speculated that Staksrud was killed, but apparently it was an accident – he fell into Gjersjøen lake, hit a stone with his head, lost consciousness and drowned. However, his elder brother Paul, who was also a speed skater and died in the 1940s, was probably shot by the Norwegian resistance.

World records 
Over the course of his career, Staksrud skated two world records:

Source: SpeedSkatingStats.com

Personal records 
To put these personal records in perspective, the WR column lists the official world records on the dates that Staksrud skated his personal records.

Note that Staksrud's personal record on the 1,500 m was not a world record because Hans Engnestangen skated 2:13.8 at the same tournament.

Staksrud has an Adelskalender score of 189.750 points. His highest ranking on the Adelskalender was a first place, which he held for a total of 728 days between 1937 and 1939.

References

Further reading
 Eng, Trond. All Time International Championships, Complete Results: 1889 – 2002. Askim, Norway: WSSSA-Skøytenytt, 2002.
 Eng, Trond; Gjerde, Arild and Teigen, Magne. Norsk Skøytestatistikk Gjennom Tidene, Menn/Kvinner, 1999 (6. utgave). Askim/Skedsmokorset/Veggli, Norway: WSSSA-Skøytenytt, 1999. 
 Eng, Trond; Gjerde, Arild; Teigen, Magne and Teigen, Thorleiv. Norsk Skøytestatistikk Gjennom Tidene, Menn/Kvinner, 2004 (7. utgave). Askim/Skedsmokorset/Veggli/Hokksund, Norway: WSSSA-Skøytenytt, 2004. 
 Eng, Trond and Teigen, Magne. Komplette Resultater fra offisielle Norske Mesterskap på skøyter, 1894 – 2005. Askim/Veggli, Norway: WSSSA-Skøytenytt, 2005.
 Teigen, Magne. Komplette Resultater Norske Mesterskap På Skøyter, 1887 – 1989: Menn/Kvinner, Senior/Junior. Veggli, Norway: WSSSA-Skøytenytt, 1989.
 Teigen, Magne. Komplette Resultater Internasjonale Mesterskap 1889 – 1989: Menn/Kvinner, Senior/Junior, allround/sprint. Veggli, Norway: WSSSA-Skøytenytt, 1989.

External links

 
 
 
 

1908 births
1940 deaths
Deaths by drowning in Norway
World record setters in speed skating
Norwegian male speed skaters
Olympic speed skaters of Norway
Speed skaters at the 1928 Winter Olympics
Speed skaters at the 1932 Winter Olympics
Speed skaters at the 1936 Winter Olympics
World Allround Speed Skating Championships medalists
People from Gran, Norway
Sportspeople from Innlandet